Rangiahuta Alan Herewini Ruka Broughton (21 April 1940 – 17 April 1986) was a New Zealand tohunga, Anglican priest, and university lecturer. Of Māori descent, he identified with the Ngā Rauru iwi. He was born in Wanganui, New Zealand on 21 April 1940, and received his education at Maxwell School, Wanganui Technical College and Te Aute College. He was married to Mere Broughton from 1960 to 1978, and they raised five children. He later remarried to Dolly Sadie Matewhiu Pene and they raised two children.

References

1940 births
1986 deaths
New Zealand educators
New Zealand Anglican priests
Ngā Rauru people
New Zealand Māori religious leaders
Tohunga
People from Whanganui
Academic staff of the Victoria University of Wellington
People educated at Whanganui City College
People educated at Te Aute College